Jack Gilbert Renner, better known for his stage name Ricky Renée (Indianapolis, 3 September 1929 - Nuremberg, 29 October 2017) was an American actor and travesti performer. He worked with the traveling Jewel Box Revue in the US and at Le Carrousel in Paris and Chez Nous Cabaret in Berlin.

Filmography

References

External links 

 rickyrenee.com
 phantomdragon.com

1929 births
2017 deaths
People from Indianapolis
American actors